Kombii is a Polish pop rock band created in 2003 by three former members of the group Kombi.

In 2003 Skawiński, Tkaczyk and Pluta created Kombii, without Sławomir Łosowski (who was the leader and creator of the original group Kombi) but with the addition of keyboardist Bartosz Wielgosz. The new band has achieved national commercial success, with a number of their releases (among them C.D., including the single "Pokolenie") charting in Poland.

Discography

Studio albums

Remix albums

Live albums

References

External links
 Official Kombii page

Polish pop music groups